Rodolphe Meaker "Skip" Vallee (born 1960) is the former American Ambassador to Slovakia (2005-2008) and is “Chairman, CEO, and owner of R. L. Vallee, Inc., a Vermont-based energy company that includes the "Maplefields" convenience store chain, a top regional motor fuels distributorship, and an environmental remediation and consulting unit. Prior to that, he worked in executive positions for several companies involved in the development and operation of trash, biomass, hydro, and other renewable energy facilities.”,

Vallee was appointed by President Bush to the Advisory Committee for Trade Policy and Negotiation in 2001, served as a member of the Republican National Committee from 1999-2004, and chaired the Vermont delegation to the 2004 Republican National Convention.

Vallee received a Bachelor's degree in biology (with a concentration in environmental studies) in 1982 from Williams College and a Master’s degree in Business Administration in 1986 from the Wharton School at the University of Pennsylvania. He was diagnosed with multiple myeloma in 2017.

In October 2019, he was one of four Vermont gas distributors that agreed to settle a class-action lawsuit after they were accused of cheating customers out of $100 million.

In May 2022 a tanker truck operated by RL Vallee Inc. killed a pedestrian in Montreal. The company's Google reviews has several complaints of aggressive and dangerous driving.

References

1960 births
Living people
People from St. Albans, Vermont
Williams College alumni
Wharton School of the University of Pennsylvania alumni
American retail chief executives
American chairpersons of corporations
Vermont Republicans
Ambassadors of the United States to Slovakia
People with multiple myeloma